The 2015 North Hertfordshire Council election was held on 5 May 2016, at the same time as other local elections across England. Of the 49 seats on North Hertfordshire District Council, 15 were up for election.

The Conservatives lost two seats, one to Labour and one to the Liberal Democrats, but retained their overall majority on the council.

Overall results
The overall results were as follows:

Ward results
The results for each ward were as follows. Where the previous incumbent was standing for re-election they are marked with an asterisk(*).

Changes 2016–2018
A by-election was held in Hitchin Oughton ward on 10 November 2016 following the resignation of Labour councillor Simon Watson. Labour retained the seat.

Two by-elections were held on 4 May 2017, at the same time as the 2017 Hertfordshire County Council election. The by-election in Royston Heath ward was triggered by the death of Conservative councillor Peter Burt. The by-election in Hitchin Priory ward was triggered by the resignation of Conservative councillor Allison Ashley. The Conservatives retained both seats.

References

2016 English local elections
2016
2010s in Hertfordshire